The 2020 Oregon Ducks football team represented the University of Oregon during the 2020 NCAA Division I FBS football season. The team was led by third-year head coach Mario Cristobal. The Ducks played their home games at Autzen Stadium in Eugene, Oregon, and competed as members of the North Division of the Pac-12 Conference.

On August 11, 2020, the Pac-12 Conference canceled all fall sports competitions due to the COVID-19 pandemic. However, the decision was reversed on September 24, when the Pac-12 announced that they would play a seven-game schedule starting November 6.

Despite finishing in second place in the North Division during the regular season, the Ducks would represent the division in the Pac-12 Championship Game due to first-place Washington having an insufficient number of players available due to COVID-19. There, they defeated the undefeated South Division champion USC to receive the Pac-12's automatic bid to a New Year's Six bowl game. They were invited to the Fiesta Bowl, where they lost to Big 12 runner-up Iowa State.

Pac-12 media day

Pac-12 media poll 
In the Pac-12 preseason media poll, Oregon was voted as the favorite to win both the North Division and the Pac-12 Championship Game.

Schedule
Oregon had three games scheduled against Ohio State, North Dakota State, and Hawaii, but canceled these games on July 10 due to the Pac-12 Conference's decision to play a conference-only schedule due to the COVID-19 pandemic.

Oregon's game against UCLA had initially been scheduled for Friday, November 20, but was moved forward a day to accommodate UCLA playing California on Sunday, November 15. The change occurred after both UCLA and California had their initially scheduled games for Saturday, November 14 (against Utah and Arizona State, respectively), canceled due to COVID-19 outbreaks within the other programs.

Rankings

Game summaries

Stanford

at Washington State

UCLA

at Oregon State

at California

at USC (Pac-12 Championship Game)

vs Iowa State (2021 Fiesta Bowl)

Players drafted into the NFL

References

Oregon
Oregon Ducks football seasons
Pac-12 Conference football champion seasons
Oregon Ducks football